The Ministry of Jean-Joseph Dessolles was formed on 29 December 1818 after the dismissal of the First ministry of Armand-Emmanuel du Plessis de Richelieu by King Louis XVIII of France. It was dissolved on 19 November 1819 and replaced by the Ministry of Élie Decazes.

Ministers
The ministers were:

References

Sources

French governments
1818 establishments in France
1819 disestablishments in France
Cabinets established in 1818
Cabinets disestablished in 1819